Gapshima (Dargwa: ХIябшима) is a rural locality (a selo) in Akushinsky District, Republic of Dagestan, Russia. The population was 1,709 as of 2010. There are 31 streets.

Geography 
Gapshima is located 10 km southwest of Akusha (the district's administrative centre) by road, on the Akusha River. Shukty is the nearest rural locality.

References 

Rural localities in Akushinsky District